Donald E. Fuoss (February 19, 1923 – June 25, 2014) was an American football and basketball coach. He served as the head football coach at Bethany College in Bethany, West Virginia from 1951 to 1952, Shepherd University in Shepherdstown, West Virginia from 1953 to 1955, and Middle Tennessee State University in 1969. Fuoss was also the head basketball coach at Shepherd from 1953 to 1956, tallying a mark of 28–36.

Head coaching record

College football

References

1923 births
2014 deaths
American football centers
Basketball coaches from Pennsylvania
Bethany Bison football coaches
Catawba Indians football players
Middle Tennessee Blue Raiders football coaches
Purdue Boilermakers football coaches
Shepherd Rams football coaches
Shepherd Rams men's basketball coaches
College track and field coaches in the United States
High school football coaches in New Jersey
High school football coaches in West Virginia
Sportspeople from Altoona, Pennsylvania
Coaches of American football from Pennsylvania
Players of American football from Pennsylvania